The University of New Mexico Arboretum is an arboretum extending throughout the University of New Mexico campus in Albuquerque, New Mexico.

The arboretum contains some 320 species of woody plants, including Albizia julibrissin, Buxus microphylla japonica, Campsis radicans, Cercis canadensis, Chilopsis linearis, Cotoneaster lacteus, Cupressus arizonica, Forestiera neomexicana, Fraxinus pennsylvanica, Fraxinus velutina, Ginkgo biloba, Gleditsia triacanthos inermis, Hedera helix, Juniperus communis, Juniperus sabina 'Broadmoor', Koelreuteria paniculata, Morus alba 'Pendula', Nandina domestica, Photinia serrulata, Pinus mugo, Pinus nigra, Pinus ponderosa, Pinus sylvestris, Platanus × hispanica, Poa pratensis, Populus canadensis 'Eugenii', Populus tremuloides, Rhaphiolepis indica, Salix babylonica, Ulmus pumila, Vitex agnus-castus.

Gallery

See also 
 List of botanical gardens in the United States

External links
 UNM Arboretum Virtual Tour

Arboreta in New Mexico
Botanical gardens in New Mexico
Arboretum
Natural history of New Mexico
Parks in Bernalillo County, New Mexico
Tourist attractions in Albuquerque, New Mexico